Douglas, Doug, or Dougie Anderson may refer to:

Arts and entertainment
Doug Anderson (poet) (born 1943), American poet, fiction writer, and memoirist
Doug Anderson (singer) (born 1973), American gospel singer
Dougie Anderson (born 1976), Scottish television & radio presenter, comedian & author
Douglas Anderson (television writer) (fl. 1990s), American writer for the television series Guiding Light

Sports
Doug Anderson (Australian footballer) (1903–1999), Australian rules footballer for Fitzroy
Doug Anderson (footballer, born 1914) (1914–1989), Scottish association footballer
Doug Anderson (rugby league) (1926–2016), New Zealand rugby league footballer
Doug Anderson (ice hockey) (1927–1998), Canadian ice hockey player
Doug Anderson (footballer, born 1963) (1963–2015), Hong Kong-born footballer who played in the English Football League

Others
Doug Anderson (politician) (1939–2013), American educator and politician from Mississippi
Douglas A. Anderson (born 1959), American fantasy writer, editor, and Tolkien scholar
Doug Anderson (journalist) (fl. 1969–2011), Australian journalist

Other uses
Douglas Anderson School of the Arts, high school in Jacksonville, Florida